Perry Park is an unincorporated community, country club and golf resort in Owen County, Kentucky, near Owenton and Carrollton. It is located one hour southwest of Cincinnati, one hour northwest of Lexington, and forty-five minutes east of Louisville, and lies on the Kentucky River.  The ZIP Code for Perry Park is 40363.

History

The land that is now Perry Park was originally used as hunting grounds by Native Americans, particularly the Iroquois. The first Caucasian to enter the current land of Perry Park, was Jacob Drennon, a land surveyor, working for James McAfee. He had heard a legend of a healing spring there, and was led by an Indian to the area. He made the first land claim there, and called it, "Lick Skillet", because the men were so hungry, that when they received their rations, they licked their skillets clean.

Kentucky became a state in 1792, and more settlers came in, including a former soldier of the American Revolutionary War, Benjamin Perry. He, his children and grandchildren moved to Perry Park from Virginia circa 1810, along with the Berryman family. In 1832, Benjamin Perry's grandson, Washington Perry, and his wife Martha, built a house called "Wildwood". For an undetermined cause, they did not reside in that house for long. At some point between 1830 and 1850 the current house "Glenwood Hall" was built. Glenwood Hall is still in use today as a bed and breakfast and dining hall. The other plantation that was formerly located in Perry Park, was the Inverness. Also a tobacco plantation, it was built by Thomas A. Berryman, and was named after his wife Lucy's birthplace, Inverness, Scotland. The Inverness House was burned down by arsonists in the 1980s. The Perrys and the Berrymans were known for their parties, and had many visitors due to the springs near their homes. In 1849, nearly 1000 guests visited the springs, most likely stopping to see one of the two families. One of their children, Merton, died of an unknown cause at the age of 10. Two other children and a servant were possibly killed by a fire, before the Civil War. It is said they are still playing in the attic, and there are numerous reports of strange occurrences. By the time of the American Civil War, Washington, being a slave holder, most likely supported the Confederacy, yet it is known for certain which side he chose. During the Civil War there were a number of minor Confederate guerrilla movements in the area. Records show that though he lost all his slaves, Washington Perry was more prosperous after the war.

Washington Perry died in 1875, Martha in 1893 and are buried at Port Royal Cemetery in Henry County, Kentucky. Their neighbors, the Berrymans, are buried at a family cemetery inside the park. Washington's grandson, Perry Minor, son of George Church Minor and Mary Perry, was given the house after Washington's death, and lived there until 1933. Sometime during his time as master of the house, it is believed that Grover Cleveland sat on a chair, still located in the house. While this may be rumor, the Cleveland campaign of 1884 did attack James G. Blaine with stories of wrongdoings to a young woman at Perry Park.

In 1933, John H. Perry, who was publisher of a number of newspapers  (including The Palm Beach Post) and another of Washington's grandchildren, bought the entire area, built a post office, and named the community Perry Park, after himself. The community, flourished in the 20th century, with many hotels and restaurants springing up, that have since been demolished. 
In 1966, Lingenfelter Investments bought the property and developed the land to include a golf course and other amenities. Glenwood Hall was utilized as a clubhouse and restaurant.

Geography and wildlife
Perry Park rests on the Kentucky River, which surrounds it on two sides. It is mostly flat, but is surrounded by mountains. Its many rolling hills are perfectly suited for golfing. There are several lakes in the area, the largest of which is "Holliday Lake". Wildlife is also very abundant in the park; the symbol of Perry Park is the deer, and there are hundreds or thousands of them in the area. Raccoons, opossum, and birds such as cardinals are also frequently seen in the area, and the surrounding forests. Perry Park is located at coordinates .

Golfing and nearby attractions
Perry Park's main attraction is a 27-hole golf course, with 9 different golf packages. It has a par of 72 and 5 sets of tees ranging from 7355 to 4000 yards. In 1997, after its former owner went into bankruptcy, the golf club (then called Glenwood Hall Golf & Country Club) was converted "from a mostly private resort to a club selling public memberships".

Also nearby is historic Carrollton and General Butler State Park.

References

External links
Perry Park Historical Foundation (PPHF)
Perry Park website

Unincorporated communities in Owen County, Kentucky
Golf clubs and courses in Kentucky
Tourist attractions in Owen County, Kentucky
Unincorporated communities in Kentucky